Lophiobagrus aquilus is a species of claroteid catfish endemic to Lake Tanganyika at the border of Burundi, the Democratic Republic of the Congo, Tanzania, and Zambia. This species grows to a length of 8.0 cm (3.1 inches) TL.

This species is nocturnal in habits, hiding amongst rocks during daylight hours.  Eggs and young are mouth-brooded by the male.

References
 

Lophiobagrus
Claroteidae
Fish of Lake Tanganyika
Fish described in 1984
Taxonomy articles created by Polbot